Billy MacKay (born  in Glenrothes) is a Scottish former professional football player who is best known for his time with Rangers.

MacKay began his career with Rangers. Whilst at Ibrox he made 37 appearances and scored four goals. He joined Hearts in 1985 and spent two seasons there making five league appearances and making the bench for the 1986 Cup Final. He also had a brief loan spell at Dunfermline Athletic whilst at Tynecastle. MacKay was forced to retire through injury in 1987.

Honours

 Scottish Cup runner-up, 1986

References

External links

1960 births
Living people
Rangers F.C. players
Association football midfielders
Heart of Midlothian F.C. players
Dunfermline Athletic F.C. players
Scottish footballers
Scottish Football League players
People from Glenrothes
Footballers from Fife